Matt Scherer (November 21, 1983 – December 2021) was an American track and field athlete and a top professional pacemaker.

High school career
Scherer competed for Red Hill High School in Bridgeport, Illinois, from 1999 through 2002. His senior year he scored 28 individual points at the Illinois High School Association State Championship meet, which placed his school 3rd in the team standings.

College career
Scherer attended the University of Oregon from 2003-2006 where he studied Business and was a 9-time All-American. In 2005 he ran the anchor leg of the 3rd place 4x400m relay team at the NCAA Championship meet, finishing in a time of 3:00.81 which was ranked #7 all-time in NCAA Championship Meet History. He won the Pac-10 championship in the 400m in 2006 in 45.19.

Professional career
Oregon Track Club

Ran the 400 meter leg of the American Record setting indoor distance medley relay on February 12, 2010.

Ran 1:14.41 in the 600m on June 15, 2008, the 8th fastest time ever run

Personal life
It was announced on December 8, 2021, that Scherer died that week, at the age of 38, as per a statement by RunnerSpace where he worked as the Chief Operating Officer.

Pacing career
Began pacing full-time in 2011 and paced for many of the top 800m and 1500m runners in the world. 

This table lists the records he paced:

Personal bests
 200m - 20.89 - 5/13/2006 
 300m - 32.77 - 8/8/2006 
 400m - 45.19 - 5/14/2006  
 400m Hurdles - 53.21 - 2003
 600m - 1:14.41 - 6/15/2008 
 800m - 1:46.11 - 6/8/2008

References

External links
 Official website
 docs.google.com - Extensive statistical spreadsheet on races paced by Matt Scherer

1983 births
2021 deaths
Oregon Ducks men's track and field athletes
American male middle-distance runners
People from Lawrence County, Illinois
Sportspeople from Illinois
Pacemakers